Carlos Santiago may refer to:

 Carlos E. Santiago, Puerto Rican American labor economist and chancellor of University of Wisconsin–Milwaukee
 Carlos Manuel Santiago (1926–2008), baseball infielder, scout and general manager
 Carlos Santiago (judoka) (born 1977), judoka from Puerto Rico